Lindt is a Swiss chocolatier and confectionery company. It can also refer to:

Places
 Groote Lindt, a village in Zwijndrecht, Netherlands
 Kleine-Lindt, a village in Zwijndrecht, Netherlands

Surname
 August R. Lindt (1905–2000), Swiss lawyer and diplomat
 Franz Lindt (1844-1901), Swiss politician
 Hermann Lindt (1872–1937), Swiss politician
 John William Lindt, FRGS, (1845-1926) Australian landscape photographer and ethnographer
 Lieselotte Van Lindt (b. 1989), a Belgian field hockey player
 Rodolphe Lindt (1855 – 1909), a Swiss chocolate manufacturer and inventor
 Rosemarie Lindt, a German ballet dancer
 Virna Lindt, a Swedish model and singer

See also
 Lind (disambiguation)
 Lint (disambiguation)